The  (Multi Super Express) is a Romancecar electric multiple unit (EMU) train type operated by the private railway operator Odakyu Electric Railway in Japan since March 2008. The trains are used on Odakyu through service to the Tokyo Metro Chiyoda Line, and some trains also travel over the Tokyo Metro Yurakucho Line, making it the first limited express train with reserved seats to operate through a subway line in Tokyo.

Operations

Weekdays
 Mt. Fuji
 Metro Sagami
 Metro Homeway

Weekends/holidays
 Metro Sagami
 Bay Resort
 Metro Hakone
 Metro Homeway

Formations

, the fleet consists of five 6-car sets and three 4-car sets (42 vehicles in total), formed as follows, with car 1 at the Odawara end and car 10 at the Shinjuku (Tokyo) end.

Cars 2, 3, 8, and 9 each have one single-arm pantograph.

Interior
All passenger saloons are designated no-smoking. cars 2, 5, and 8 are equipped with toilets. Refreshment counters are provided in cars 3 and 9.

History
Two six-car sets and one four-car set were ordered in September 2006, with the first six-car set delivered from Nippon Sharyo in October 2007. The trains entered service on 15 March 2008.

In 2009, the 60000 series MSE was awarded the Blue Ribbon Award, presented annually in Japan by the Japan Railfan Club for railway vehicles voted as being the most outstanding design of the year.

A third six-car set was delivered in October 2009.

A fifth six-car set (60255) was delivered from Nippon Sharyo in late October 2015, followed by a third four-car set (60053) in November 2015.

References

External links

 Odakyu Romancecar MSE 
 Odakyu 60000 series information on Nippon Sharyo website 

Electric multiple units of Japan
60000 series MSE
Train-related introductions in 2008
Nippon Sharyo multiple units
1500 V DC multiple units of Japan